Placodiscus is a genus of plant in family Sapindaceae. The following species are accepted by Plants of the World Online:

Placodiscus amaniensis Radlk.
Placodiscus angustifolius Radlk. ex Engl.
Placodiscus attenuatus J.B.Hall
Placodiscus bancoensis Aubrév. & Pellegr.
Placodiscus boya Aubrév. & Pellegr.
Placodiscus bracteosus J.B.Hall
Placodiscus caudatus Pierre ex Pellegr.
Placodiscus gimbiensis Hauman
Placodiscus glandulosus Radlk.
Placodiscus leptostachys Radlk.
Placodiscus oblongifolius J.B.Hall
Placodiscus opacus Radlk.
Placodiscus paniculatus Hauman
Placodiscus pedicellatus F.G.Davies
Placodiscus pseudostipularis Radlk.
Placodiscus pynaertii De Wild.
Placodiscus resendeanus Exell & Mendonça
Placodiscus riparius Keay
Placodiscus splendidus Keay
Placodiscus turbinatus Radlk.

References

 
Sapindaceae genera
Taxonomy articles created by Polbot